Mobinex is a provider of mobile applications to mobile operators, content providers, media companies, and enterprises since 2002. Mobinex provides various mobile applications with specializations including but not limited to:

Mobile financial services
M-commerce
Mobile security
 Mobile capture

Company's spin-off product Smartface Platform is a drag-and-drop cross-platform mobile application development and management tool which enables fast publishing of mobile applications across different operating systems.

Corporate history
The company was founded on May 15, 2002. It was initially focused developing Smartface Platform, cross mobile application development and management tool.

2002  Mobinex is founded

2002  Mobinex launches “Push to Talk”

2003  The service “Push to Talk Plus” is acquired by Telsim (Vodafone Turkey)

2004  Mobinex launches Smartface Platform

2006  Smartface Platform is selected by operators for their value added services operations

2009  Smarface Platform started facilitating in Banking Sector by integration with OTP Providers

2010  Smartface Platform is chosen by Banks for their operations in mobile channels

2010  Mobinex unveils Smartface Designer Community Edition

2011  Mobinex launches Smartface Financial Services Platform

2014  Smartface Platform was spun-off to Smartface Inc. for the development of next generation Smartface App Studio

Customers 
Main customers of Mobinex:
Abank
Akbank
Aktifbank
Garanti Bank
ING Bank
Kuveyt Turk Bank
Limango
Vodafone

Products

Push to Talk Plus (PoC+)
Push to Talk Plus, also known as PoC+, is an application that uses a method of conversing on half-duplex communication lines, including two-way radio, using a momentary button to switch from voice reception mode to transmit mode. It uses a service option for a cellular phone network which permits subscribers to use their phone as a walkie-talkie with unlimited range. One significant advantage of PoC+ is that it allows a single person to reach an active talk group with a single button press; users need not make several calls to coordinate with a group.

Smartface Platform
Smartface Platform is drag-and-drop cross-platform mobile application development and management tool and first released in 2006. Smartface Designer, the component of Smartface Platform enables visual development of mobile applications with drag-and-drop actions and interactive wizards. Smartface Server the other component of the platform provides an application life-cycle management system, with capabilities of distributing, tracking, promoting and advertising of applications. After its spin-off from Mobinex in 2014, the next generation of the platform, Smartface App Studio is being developed by Smartface Inc, a Palo Alto company.

References 

Mobile software
Mobile technology companies